Jennifer Magalí Mora Cáceres (born 11 November 1996) is a Paraguayan footballer who plays as a defender. She has been a member of the Paraguay women's national team.

International career
Mora represented Paraguay at the 2014 FIFA U-20 Women's World Cup. At senior level, she played the 2014 Copa América Femenina.

References

External links

1996 births
Living people
Women's association football defenders
Paraguayan women's footballers
Paraguay women's international footballers
Cerro Porteño players
21st-century Paraguayan women
20th-century Paraguayan women